The Honister Slate Mine in Cumbria is the last working slate mine in England. Quarrying for Westmorland green slate has been taking place in the area since 1728. Apart from the mining it is also a popular tourist attraction in the Lake District National Park.

History
Opencast quarrying had been carried out at Honister since the late 17th century. But as capacity increased, the site's underground workings were extensively expanded.

19th century

By 1870 Honister's underground workings stretched under Honister Crag with intermediate workings on the opposite side of the valley at Yew Crags. Smaller-scale underground workings on Dubbs Moor, together with a small opencast quarry. Packhorse teams had been used to remove the finished slate on sleds from mines. This involved bringing the loads down steep paths that traversed the cliffs to the top of Honister Pass (The Hause). Dubbs mine was known for its 'smaller metal' (metal being the terminology for slate), in that smaller pieces of slate (thus smaller slates) were obtainable due to the geology; but this did give rise to some instability.

In 1879 the mine's new owners - who also leased and operated other quarries in Borrowdale - installed self-acting inclines to serve both the Honister and Yew Crags mines. Despite the cost to build these feats of engineering, the financial outlay proved correct as they improved efficiency in the mines. For instance the Dubbs Quarry incline allowed slate to be pulled up and then down into the valley to The Hause. Although by mid-1920s, aerial ropeways now served the Honister and Yew Crags Mines, the external Yew Crags incline proved to be so efficient it remained in use until the late 1960s. A petrol-driven narrow-gauge locomotive was used to make the connection between the Hause/slate works and the incline and short aerial ropeway. A bridge carried the railway over the Seatoller-Buttermere road. The bridge was scrapped in the early 1970s.

By 1891 production had reached 3,000 tons a year and more than 100 men were employed in the mines.

20th century

The mines reverted to care and maintenance for a while due to labour shortages in First World War. However it did not take long for production to recommence after the cessation of hostilities. By 1926, following a change of management and a new Resident Director, Robin Hoare, the mine's fortunes began to improve with significantly increased production. Considerable modifications were undertaken throughout the quarries, such as the works at The Hause being electrified with two Ruston 4-cylinder diesel generators.

Work also began to complete a proposal (that had first been made in the mid-1890s) to drive a level through to the Dubbs Quarries. About  of level was completed before the project was shelved in favour of further developing the more significant workings under Honister Crag. In 1932, Dubbs Quarry ceased production largely due to the difficulties and slowness of transporting finished slate.

Despite an enforced closure from 1943 to 1945 during the Second World War production continued through the 1950s and 1960s although Yew Crag mine closed in 1966 due to difficult roof conditions.

Closure
In 1981, after fifteen years of poor management, all the quarries of the Buttermere & Westmorland Green Slate Co.Ltd. were acquired by B.R. Moore and his father, R.D.Moore. The pair introduced a programme of improvement and a large amount of capital investment was undertaken. This included the installation of rail-borne EIM-Co Rockershovels, battery locomotives, improved rolling stock and increased specialist underground mechanisation and systems (the Moores were helped by their General Manager, Jim Peart, of Weardale mining - previously manager of the Burtree Pasture, Rookhope, and Stanhope Burn lead and fluorspar mines). It was the first use of such equipment in any underground Lake District quarry (the quarries had operated surface diesel locos from about 1930 to the late 1950s).

In 1985 the Moore family sold the company and its quarries to Alfred McAlpine plc which also owned Penrhyn Quarry in Bethesda, North Wales. In 1989 McAlpine ceased operations at all the quarries. Only care and maintenance was undertaken.

Reopening & resurgence 

In 1997 the mine was reopened by local businessman, Mark Weir, who redeveloped the mining side - producing small quantities of roofing slate - and who also turned the site into a tourist attraction.

A  narrow gauge industrial railway is used to assist in the slate extraction process.

Attractions around the mine complex include a visitor centre, underground tours of the workings, and England's first via ferrata, where participants use a safety harness to scale a cliff path. This attraction proved to be very popular and in 2011 was awarded winner of “Best Tourism Experience in The Lake District" by Cumbria Tourism. Using the original Miners track up the steep outer incline of Fleetwith Pike, the via ferrata is both physically and mentally challenging.

Zip wire
Honister Mine featured in the 2011 BBC television programme Tales from the National Park. It followed owner Mark Weir, and his attempt to open a zip wire from the top of Fleetwith Pike to the mine below. Weir died in a helicopter crash in March 2011 (during the making of the programme). He had been trying to obtain planning permission for the proposed zip wire. His business was also facing a prosecution on the part of Natural England in respect of damage to plants within a designated Site of Special Scientific Interest (Honister Crag SSSI). The damage was related to an unapproved extension which Weir had made to the via ferrata. 

A 2012 planning application for the zip wire was refused by the Park Authority on the grounds of impact, despite support from explorer and Lake District resident Sir Chris Bonington and notable business and tourism organisations.

See also 
 British narrow gauge slate railways

References

Sources 
 John Adams Mines of the Lake District, Dalesman, 1995, 
 Ian Tyler  Honister - The History of a Lakeland slate mine

External links 
 Honister Slate Mine
 Lake District Walks - Honister

Slate mines in England
Buildings and structures in Cumbria
2 ft gauge railways in England
Tourist attractions in Cumbria
Industrial railways in England
Surface mines in England
Mines in Cumbria
Railway inclines in the United Kingdom